The Wedding Planners is a Canadian television drama series, which premiered March 27, 2020 on Citytv. The series is produced by Brain Power Studios, founded and executive produced be Beth Stevenson.

Premise
The series centres on the Clarksons, three estranged siblings who reconnect to carry on their mother's wedding planning business after her death.

Cast
 
Kimberly-Sue Murray as Paige Clarkson
Michael Seater as James Clarkson
Madeline Leon as Hannah Clarkson
Michelle Nolden as Marguerite, their mother

Episodes

References

External links
 
 

2020 Canadian television series debuts
2020s Canadian drama television series
2020s Canadian LGBT-related drama television series
Citytv original programming